Jasna Beri (born Jasna Ornela Bery; 2 January 1954) is a Bosnian actress. She appeared in more than forty films since 1975.

Selected filmography

References

External links 

1954 births
Living people
Bosnia and Herzegovina film actresses